Maria Norrfalk (born March 25, 1952), is a Swedish civil servant and the incumbent Governor of Dalarna County in Sweden. Norrfalk was educated as a forester, and served as Director General of the Swedish Forest Agency from 1994 to 2003. From 2003 to 2007 Norrfalk was the Director General of the Swedish International Development Cooperation Agency, and from 2007 she has been the Governor of Dalarna County.

References

County governors of Sweden
1952 births
Living people